Sorkhrud District is a district (bakhsh) in Mahmudabad County, Mazandaran Province, Iran. At the 2006 census, its population was 30,657, in 8,398 families.  The district has one city: Sorkhrud.  The District has two rural districts (dehestan): Dabuy-ye Shomali Rural District and Harazpey-ye Shomali Rural District.

References 

Mahmudabad County
Districts of Mazandaran Province